Winged Victory is a 1944 American drama film directed by George Cukor, a joint effort of 20th Century-Fox and the U.S. Army Air Forces. Based upon the 1943 play of the same name by Moss Hart, who also wrote the screenplay, the film opened only after the play's theatre run. The film version of Winged Victory used many of the Broadway cast, who were brought to Hollywood.

Plot
Frankie Davis (Lon McCallister), Allan Ross (Mark Daniels) and "Pinky" Scariano (Don Taylor) join the U.S. Army Air Forces with hopes of becoming pilots. In training, they befriend Irving Miller (Edmond O'Brien) and Bobby Crills (Barry Nelson). The five friends go through the training process to become pilots, facing success, failure, and tragedy.

Allan, newly married, finds that wife Dorothy (Jo-Carroll Dennison) plans to go with him to aviation school. Frankie, whose hometown bride Jane (Jane Ball) is living with Dorothy near the camp, watches with concern as some of the other cadets receive "wash-out tickets". For now, he is safe.

Pinky washes out when he has fails his eye test, but is classified a gunner and ships out for separate training. Frankie, Allan and their friends, Irving and Bobby are assigned to pilot training. During the cadets' first night flight, Frankie crashes. The group of friends, now one more short, are devastated. Allan volunteers to give tragic news to Jane, who is expecting their first child.

When the group wins their wings and are assigned to their units, Pinky is assigned to the same aircraft flown by Allan and Irving, and together with their five crew mates, they name their craft "Winged Victory." The next assignment is to join the fighting in the South Pacific, but before leaving they see their wives in San Francisco. Trying to keep their assignment secret, their wives guess their husbands are going to go into combat.

At their South Pacific base in New Guinea, the exhausted crew of the "Winged Victory" join the other crews in a Christmas celebration. In the midst of the festivities, an air raid siren sounds, and they take off for battle. During the fight, a tire on the "Winged Victory" is damaged during combat, and Pinky is wounded. After the aircraft makes a rough but safe landing at the base, Pinky is rushed away in an ambulance.

Back at the base, Allan learns that his wife has given birth to a son. Before taking off to rejoin the air battle, he writes a letter to his son, explaining the importance of his mission and his hopes for the future.

Cast

 Lon McCallister as Frankie Davis
 Jeanne Crain as Helen
 Edmond O'Brien as Irving Miller
 Jane Ball as Jane Preston
 Mark Daniels as Alan Ross
 Jo-Carroll Dennison as Dorothy Ross
 Don Taylor as Danny "Pinky" Scariano
 Judy Holliday as Ruth Miller
 Lee J. Cobb as Doctor
 Peter Lind Hayes as O'Brien
 Alan Baxter as Major Halper
 Red Buttons as "Whitey"/Andrews Sister 
 Barry Nelson as Bobby Crills
 Rune Hultman as Dave Anderson
 Gary Merrill as Capt. McIntyre
 George Reeves as Lt. Thompson

Production
Fox bought the film rights for $350,000.

Winged Victory entered principal photography on June 15, 1944, and wrapped production on September 25, 1944. The United States Army Air Forces provided 14 technical advisers to the production company. The advisers were able to provide information on training, graduation exercises and even combat experience. Included in the group of pilots was a chaplain and flight surgeon.

The aircraft seen in Winged Victory include 27 Consolidated B-24J Liberator bombers featured in the combat scenes and 55 Vultee BT-13A Valiant as well as numerous Cessna AT-17 Bobcat trainers. A number of Curtiss P-40N Warhawk fighters were also seen.

Reception
Winged Victory was critically reviewed by Bosley Crowther in The New York Times. He enthusiastically praised the film ("lurid adventure episodes" in the story) and commented: "The Army Air Force show, 'Winged Victory,' which was a big and deserving hit upon the stage, has now been transposed into the medium which was most appropriate to it all the time—the large-scale and swiftly fluid medium of the motion picture screen. And, as it looked yesterday at the Roxy, where it opened amid a rout of brass and pomp, it gives every promise of being one of the most successful films about this war."

The review in Variety was similarly effusive about Winged Victory: "This is no story of any specific segment of Americana; it is, rather, the tale of Main Street and Broadway, of Texas and Brooklyn, of Christian and Jew—of American youth fighting for the preservation of American ideals. This is a documentation of American youth learning to fly for victory—a winged victory—and though it's fashioned in the manner of fictional entertainment, all the boys listed are bona fide members of the AAF—acting real-life roles."

References

Notes

Citations

Bibliography

 Beck, Simon D. The Aircraft-Spotter's Film and Television Companion. Jefferson, North Carolina: McFarland and Company, 2016. .
 Orriss, Bruce. When Hollywood Ruled the Skies: The Aviation Film Classics of World War II. Hawthorne, California: Aero Associates Inc., 1984. .
 Paris, Michael. From the Wright Brothers to Top Gun: Aviation, Nationalism, and Popular Cinema. Manchester, UK: Manchester University Press, 1995. .
 Pendo, Stephen. Aviation in the Cinema. Lanham, Maryland: Scarecrow Press, 1985. .
 Solomon, Aubrey. Twentieth Century-Fox: A Corporate and Financial History. Lanham, Maryland: Rowman & Littlefield, 2002. .

External links
 
 

1944 films
1940s war drama films
20th Century Fox films
American aviation films
American black-and-white films
American war drama films
American World War II propaganda films
Films about the United States Army Air Forces
Films directed by George Cukor
Films produced by Darryl F. Zanuck
Films scored by David Rose
1944 drama films